Barratt is the title of the only solo album released by Norman Barratt. Barratt was previously a member of the Alwyn Wall Band and the Barratt Band. In 1984, following the breakup of the Barratt Band he released a worship album Rock for all Ages with Dave Morris, the Barratt Bands keyboard player.

Track listing
All songs written and arranged by Norman Barratt.
 "The Last Night" 
 "I Know Where You Are" 
 "I Can See It in Your Eyes" 
 "Now I Know" 
 "Automatic Life" 
 "Still Waitin'"
 "When the Night Comes" 
 "Sing a New Song"

Personnel
Norman Barratt: Guitars, vocals, additional programming
Steve Boyce-Buckley: Keyboards
Mark Olly: Percussion

Production notes
Produced by Norman Barratt, Steve Boyce-Buckley and Trevor Taylor (Vocals on "Now I Know")
Engineered by Steve Boyce-Buckley
Mixed by Norman Barratt and Steve Boyce-Buckley
Assistant engineers: Bob Little, Damon Gough (aka Badly Drawn Boy) and John Barratt
Programming by Steve Boyce-Buckley
Guitar effects and programming by Neil Costello
Recorded at Square 1 Studios, Bury, England
For those technical minded, the album was recorded using a 40 channel AMEK 2025 with automation & an OTARI MTR90 analogue machine. Computer programming was achieved via an ATARI ST1040 running PRO24. The album took around 4 weeks to record and about 10 days to mix.

CD Re-issue
1991 Reguge Records, 790-060-5509

References

1988 albums